The Venera 12 ( meaning Venus 12) was an uncrewed Soviet space mission designed to explore the planet Venus. Venera 12 was launched on 14 September 1978 at 02:25:13 UTC.

During its descent, the lander employed aerodynamic braking followed by parachute braking, ending with atmospheric braking. After a nearly one-hour descent, a soft landing was made at 06:30 Moscow time (0330 UT) on 21 December. Continuing for about 110 minutes after touchdown, the lander transmitted data to the flight platform for about 110 minutes until the flight platform, which remained in a heliocentric orbit, moved out of range. Venera 11 and 12 carried identical instruments.

Flight platform
The Venera 12 flight platform carried solar wind detectors, ionosphere electron instruments, and two gamma ray burst detectors – the Soviet-built KONUS and the French-built SIGNE 2. The SIGNE 2 detectors were simultaneously flown on Venera 12 and Prognoz 7 to allow for triangulation of gamma ray sources. Before and after the Venus flyby, Venera 11 and Venera 12 yielded detailed time-profiles for 143 gamma-ray bursts, resulting in the first ever catalog of such events. The last gamma-ray burst reported by Venera 12 occurred on 5 January 1980. Venera 12 used its ultraviolet spectrometer to study comet Bradfield (C/1979 Y1) on 13 February 1980, and reported spectrophotometric data until 19 March 1980.

The list of flight platform instruments and experiments are:

 30–166 nm Extreme UV spectrometer
 Compound plasma spectrometer
 KONUS Gamma-ray burst detector
 SNEG Gamma-ray burst detector
 Magnetometer 
 4 Semiconductor counters
 2 Gas-discharge counters
 4 Scintillation counters
 Hemispherical proton telescope

The active phase of the science mission for the flight platform ended in April 1980. Venera 12 is currently in heliocentric orbit, with perihelion of 0.69 AU, aphelion of 1.01 AU, eccentricity of 0.19, inclination of 2.3 degrees and orbital period of 284 days.

Lander
The Venera 12 descent craft carried instruments designed to study the detailed chemical composition of the atmosphere, the nature of the clouds, and the thermal balance of the atmosphere. These instruments included a gas chromatograph to measure the composition of the Venus atmosphere, instruments to study scattered solar radiation and soil composition, and a device named Groza which was designed to measure atmospheric electrical discharges. Results reported included evidence of lightning and thunder, a high 36Ar/40Ar ratio, and the discovery of carbon monoxide at low altitudes.

Each of the Venera 11 and Venera 12 included landers with a pair of cameras, each of which was designed for color imaging. A design flaw prevented the lens caps from separating, resulting in all cameras failing to capture and return images.

The list of lander experiments and instruments are:
 Backscatter nephelometer
 Mass spectrometer – MKh-6411
 Gas chromatograph – Sigma
 X-ray fluorospectrometer
 360° scanning photometer – IOAV
 Spectrometer (430–1170 nm)
 Microphone / anemometer
 Low-Frequency radio sensor
 4 Thermometers
 3 Barometers
 Accelerometer – Bizon
 Penetrometer – PrOP-V
 Soil Analysis Device
 2 Color Cameras 
 Small solar batteries – MSB

See also

 List of missions to Venus
 Timeline of artificial satellites and space probes

References

External links
 Venera 11 & Venera 12 (NASA)
 Drilling into the Surface of Venus (Venera 11 and 12)

Venera program
1978 in spaceflight
1978 in the Soviet Union
Derelict landers (spacecraft)
Spacecraft launched in 1978